Mansoor Saeed Abdulla Al-Menhali (born 29 September 2003) is an Emirati professional footballer who plays as a forward for UAE Pro League side Al-Wahda.

Career statistics

Club

References

External links
 

2003 births
Living people
Emirati footballers
Association football forwards
Al Wahda FC players
UAE Pro League players